Centropogon azuayensis is a species of plant in the family Campanulaceae. It is endemic to Ecuador.  Its natural habitat is subtropical or tropical moist montane forests. It is threatened by habitat loss.

References

Flora of Ecuador
azuayensis
Endangered plants
Taxonomy articles created by Polbot